MotoGP '06 is a Grand Prix motorcycle racing video game for the Xbox 360. It is based on the 2005 and 2006 MotoGP seasons

Reception

The game received "favorable" reviews according to the review aggregation website Metacritic. In Japan, where the game was ported for release on October 12, 2006, Famitsu gave it a score of 29 out of 40.

References

External links

2006 video games
Grand Prix motorcycle racing video games
Racing video games
THQ games
Video games developed in the United Kingdom
Xbox 360-only games
Xbox 360 games
Grand Prix motorcycle racing
Video games set in Australia
Video games set in California
Video games set in China
Video games set in the Czech Republic
Video games set in England
Video games set in France
Video games set in Germany
Video games set in Italy
Video games set in Japan
Video games set in Malaysia
Video games set in the Netherlands
Video games set in Qatar
Video games set in Spain
Video games set in Portugal
Video games set in Turkey